Briery Branch is an unincorporated community located in Rockingham County, in the U.S. state of Virginia. It is located west of Ottobine and its trail leads into the George Washington National Forest.

References

Unincorporated communities in Rockingham County, Virginia
Unincorporated communities in Virginia